Beaufort County is a county located in the U.S. state of North Carolina.  As of the 2020 census, the population was 44,652. Its county seat is Washington. The county was founded in 1705 as Pamptecough Precinct. Originally included in Bath County, it was renamed Beaufort Precinct in 1712 and became Beaufort County in 1739.

History
Beaufort County was first called Pamptecough.  The name was changed about 1712 to Beaufort, named for Henry Somerset, 2nd Duke of Beaufort (1684–1714), who became one of Carolina's Lords Proprietor around 1709.

Geography

It is the fifth-largest county in North Carolina by total area. It is split in half by the Pamlico River and the mouth of the Pamlico River.

State and local protected areas/sites 
 Goose Creek Game Land (part)
 Goose Creek State Park
 Historic Bath
 Van Swamp Game Lands (part)

Major water bodies 
 Goose Creek
 Intracoastal Waterway
 Pamlico River
 Pungo River
 South River
 Tar River

Adjacent counties
 Washington County - northeast
 Martin County - northwest
 Hyde County - east
 Pamlico County - south
 Craven County - southwest
 Pitt County - west

Major highways

Major infrastructure 
 Bayview - Aurora Ferry
 Washington - Warren Field Airport (OCW)

Demographics

Beaufort County comprises the Washington, NC Micropolitan Statistical Area, which is also included in the Greenville-Washington, NC Combined Statistical Area.

2020 census

As of the 2020 United States census, there were 44,652 people, 19,701 households, and 12,638 families residing in the county.

2000 census
As of the census of 2000, there were 44,958 people, 18,319 households, and 12,951 families residing in the county.  The population density was 54 people per square mile (21/km2).  There were 22,139 housing units at an average density of 27 per square mile (10/km2).  The racial makeup of the county was 68.44% White, 29.03% Black or African American, 0.16% Native American, 0.22% Asian, 0.02% Pacific Islander, 1.42% from other races, and 0.71% from two or more races.  3.24% of the population were Hispanic or Latino of any race.

There were 18,319 households, out of which 28.80% had children under the age of 18 living with them, 53.60% were married couples living together, 13.30% had a female householder with no husband present, and 29.30% were non-families. 25.70% of all households were made up of individuals, and 11.50% had someone living alone who was 65 years of age or older.  The average household size was 2.42 and the average family size was 2.89.

In the county, the population was spread out, with 23.40% under the age of 18, 7.70% from 18 to 24, 26.10% from 25 to 44, 26.90% from 45 to 64, and 15.90% who were 65 years of age or older.  The median age was 40 years. For every 100 females there were 91.10 males.  For every 100 females age 18 and over, there were 87.50 males.

The median income for a household in the county was $31,066, and the median income for a family was $37,893. Males had a median income of $30,483 versus $21,339 for females. The per capita income for the county was $16,722.  About 15.20% of families and 19.50% of the population were below the poverty line, including 27.60% of those under age 18 and 19.30% of those age 65 or over.

As of 2010 the largest self-reported ancestry groups in Beaufort County, North Carolina were:
 English - 14.4%
 "American" - 11.9%
 German - 6.6%
 Irish - 6.0%
 Scottish - 2.5%
 French - 1.6%
 Italian - 1.5%

Government and politics
Beaufort is a typical “Solid South” county in its voting patterns. It voted Democratic consistently up through 1964, even resisting the lure of voting against Al Smith’s Catholic faith and opposition to Prohibition in 1928 when North Carolina went Republican for the only time between 1876 and 1964. However, the increasing social and racial liberalism of the Democratic Party turned its electorate to George Wallace in 1968 and overwhelmingly to Richard Nixon against George McGovern four years later. Since then, Beaufort has been a strongly Republican county, with the last Democrat to carry it being Jimmy Carter in 1976.

Beaufort County is a member of the Mid-East Commission regional council of governments.

Beaufort County was the site of a proposed Navy outlying landing field. This practice airfield would allow pilots to simulate landings on an aircraft carrier. Construction, which has not yet begun, is controversial due to its potential ecological impact.

Education
Beaufort County Schools is the local public school system.

Communities

City
 Washington (county seat and largest city)

Towns
 Aurora
 Bath
 Belhaven
 Chocowinity
 Pantego
 Washington Park

Census-designated places
 Bayview
 Cypress Landing
 Pinetown
 River Road

Townships
 Bath
 Chocowinity
 Long Acre
 Pantego
 Richland
 Washington

Other unincorporated communities
 Blounts Creek
 Edward

Population ranking
The population ranking of the following table is based on the 2022 estimate of Beaufort County.

† county seat

See also
 List of counties in North Carolina
 National Register of Historic Places listings in Beaufort County, North Carolina
 North Carolina Ferry System
 North Carolina State Parks
 Bath, North Carolina, first provincial capital before Edenton.

References

External links

 
 
 Life on the Pamlico: A Publication of Beaufort County Community College
 The Beaufort Sun

 
1739 establishments in North Carolina
Populated places established in 1739